Hata Dam is a gravity dam located in Fukuoka Prefecture in Japan. The dam is used for water supply. The catchment area of the dam is 10.7 km2. The dam impounds about 51  ha of land when full and can store 7349 thousand cubic meters of water. The construction of the dam was started on 1939 and completed in 1955.

References

Dams in Fukuoka Prefecture
1955 establishments in Japan